Ibrahima Tamba (born 1 January 1967) is a Senegalese sprinter. He competed in the 200 metres at the 1988 Summer Olympics and the 1992 Summer Olympics.

References

1967 births
Living people
Athletes (track and field) at the 1988 Summer Olympics
Athletes (track and field) at the 1992 Summer Olympics
Senegalese male sprinters
Olympic athletes of Senegal
Place of birth missing (living people)